Route 15, consisting of the contiguous segments of State Route 15 (SR 15) and Interstate 15 (I-15), is a major north–south state highway and Interstate Highway in the U.S. state of California, connecting San Bernardino, Riverside, and San Diego Counties. The route consists of the southernmost  of I-15, which extends north through Nevada, Arizona, Utah, Idaho, and Montana to the Canada–US border. It is a major thoroughfare for traffic between San Diego and the Inland Empire, as well as between Southern California, Las Vegas, Nevada, and the Intermountain West.

This segment was initially signed as a state route instead of an Interstate, but it is being upgraded to Interstate standards so it would become part of I-15 in the future.

I-15 has portions designated as the Escondido Freeway, Avocado Highway, Temecula Valley Freeway, Corona Freeway, Ontario Freeway, Barstow Freeway, CHP Officer Larry L. Wetterling and San Bernardino County Sheriff's Lieutenant Alfred E. Stewart Memorial Highway, or Mojave Freeway.

Route description

I-15 and SR 15 are part of the California Freeway and Expressway System, and are part of the National Highway System, a network of highways that are considered essential to the country's economy, defense, and mobility by the Federal Highway Administration. I-15 from SR 76 to SR 91 and SR 58 to SR 127 is eligible to be included in the State Scenic Highway System, but it is not officially designated as a scenic highway by the California Department of Transportation.

San Diego County 
SR 15 begins south of I-5 at 32nd Street near Harbor Drive. After this, SR 15 has an interchange with SR 94, which has been cited as not being up to Interstate standards. The route then meets I-805; however, one can only continue in the same direction that they were going at this interchange, since the overall shape of this interchange is an elongated "X". Between the Polk Avenue and Orange Avenue overpasses, the freeway goes under a city park that was built on top of the freeway during construction in 2001. Pedestrian bridges were also built at Monroe Avenue and Landis Street to reduce the effects of the freeway geographically dividing the community. Between I-805 and I-8, SR 15 follows the former alignment of 40th Street, which was its former routing as a city street. It continues seamlessly into the southern terminus of I-15 at I-8; on the northbound conversion to I-15 at I-8, there is no "End SR 15" sign.

There are various local names for the highway, such as the Escondido Freeway between San Diego and Escondido. I-15 between SR 163 and Pomerado Road / Miramar Road is known as the Semper Fi Highway in recognition of the nearby Marine Corps Air Station Miramar. I-15 between Scripps Poway Parkway and Camino Del Norte is known as the Tony Gwynn Memorial Freeway in recognition of Tony Gwynn, who played baseball for the San Diego Padres and San Diego State. North of the Escondido city limits, it is known as the Avocado Highway, whose designation ends upon entering Temecula. There are other local names as noted below.

Heading northward, I-15 currently begins at I-8, at the same place that its continuation, SR 15, begins its southward journey. I-15 goes through Mission Valley and Kearny Mesa, intersecting with SR 52 just before merging with SR 163. After traversing the Marine Corps Air Station Miramar, I-15 comes into Rancho Peñasquitos, where it meets the eastern end of SR 56. Northward, the route crosses Lake Hodges inside the upper San Diego city limits. I-15 continues north into Escondido, where it intersects with SR 78.

North of Escondido, I-15 goes through hilly terrain and farmland, passes under the Lilac Road Bridge and approaches the community of Fallbrook near the SR 76 interchange. It passes the community of Rainbow, crosses the Riverside county line and descends into the Inland Empire.

Inland Empire 
In Temecula, I-15 runs concurrently with SR 79 for 3.2 miles (5 km) before the latter branches off toward Hemet. In Murrieta, I-15 splits from its only auxiliary route in California, I-215, which retains the Escondido Freeway designation and runs through the two largest cities in the Inland Empire, Riverside and San Bernardino. I-15 continues northwest as the Temecula Valley Freeway.

I-15 runs along the eastern edge of the Santa Ana Mountains, passing through the cities of Wildomar and Lake Elsinore. In Lake Elsinore, I-15 intersects SR 74, a major highway connecting the city with San Juan Capistrano as well as points east such as Perris, Hemet, Idyllwild, and the Coachella Valley. It continues northwest through the unincorporated area of Temescal Valley as the Corona Freeway and passes through the city of Corona. During this stretch, I-15 has an interchange with SR 91, a major east–west highway; this interchange serves as a vital link between southwestern Riverside County and Orange County. North of SR 91, I-15 continues through the city of Norco, crosses the Santa Ana River, and heads due north along the boundary between the cities of Eastvale and Jurupa Valley. I-15 enters San Bernardino County just past an interchange with SR 60, another major east–west highway, which connects I-15 with the Chino Valley and the southern San Gabriel Valley. I-15 passes through the city of Ontario on its way to I-10, the main east–west artery though Southern California. North of I-10, I-15 passes through the cities of Rancho Cucamonga and Fontana as it intersects SR 210, an east–west highway skirting the San Gabriel and San Bernardino mountain ranges. SR 210 connects I-15 to major foothill communities such as Pasadena, Rialto, and San Bernardino. I-15 also crosses old US 66 during this stretch of highway, which is signed as SR 66, Foothill Boulevard. At this junction, I-15 takes a strongly northeastern alignment as it moves to rejoin with its spur route, I-215, in Devore, in northern San Bernardino. The highway then heads northward and upward through the Cajon Pass, an important mountain pass that is the primary route between Southern California and points further north and east.

The portion of I-15 that is located between its northern and southern junctions with I-215 is also used by many local residents as the major north–south route for the western portions of the San Bernardino–Riverside–Ontario metropolitan area. (I-215 serves a similar function in the eastern portion of the metropolitan area. These two highways are also the only continuous north–south freeways in the area.)

North of Limonite Avenue (south of SR 60), I-15 is known as the Ontario Freeway (formerly known as the Devore Freeway prior to 1989). After its northern merge with I-215 in Devore, I-15 is called the Barstow Freeway or the Mojave Freeway. A short section between SR 138 and Oak Hill Road is also designated as the CHP Officer Larry L. Wetterling and San Bernardino County Sheriff's Lieutenant Alfred E. Stewart Memorial Highway, named after two officers killed in the line of duty. On this stretch of highway, I-15 northbound splits from I-15 southbound, where the road ascends up a steep grade until it reaches Cajon Summit (elevation ) just south of the High Desert communities of Hesperia and Oak Hills. The southbound lanes provide a runaway truck ramp as a safety feature. The two halves of the highway rejoin shortly before reaching Cajon Summit.

North of the Cajon Pass, I-15 traverses the High Desert cities of Hesperia, where it meets the southern end of US 395, and Victorville. I-15 passes through desert for  before reaching Barstow, where it meets the eastern terminus of SR 58 and the western terminus of I-40. It then passes Zzyzx Road more than  later, before reaching the town of Baker. The sign for Zzyzx Road—alphabetically the last place name in the world—is a landmark of sorts on the drive between Los Angeles and Las Vegas. A runaway truck ramp is provided for northbound I-15 traffic near the dry Ivanpah Lake at the end of Mountain Pass.

The Mojave Freeway is fairly busy on weekdays, since it connects the rapidly growing exurbs of the Victor Valley with the Los Angeles area. On weekends and holidays, however, it can sometimes be jammed with Californians driving to Las Vegas for short vacations.

Express lanes

There are two sections of High-occupancy toll (HOT) lanes along I-15. The first section is in San Diego County between SR 163 in San Diego and SR 78 in Escondido. The lanes were originally constructed as reversible carpool lanes in 1988 before they were converted into express lanes a decade later. Between 2004 and 2008, construction extended the lanes north from SR 56 to Del Lago Boulevard in Escondido. Then, between 2009 and 2012, work was done to widen the southern reversible segment from two lanes to four, and then extend the corridor north to SR 78. In addition, five direct access ramps allow for easier local access, as well as access to bus service from MTS Rapid.

The second segment of HOT lanes is in Riverside County, featuring one to two tolled express lanes in each direction from Cajalco Road in Corona to SR 60. These lanes began construction in 2018 and opened in 2021.

The HOT lanes in Riverside County, administered by the Riverside County Transportation Commission (RCTC), have different toll polices than the ones in San Diego County, administered by the San Diego Association of Governments (SANDAG). In both segments, solo drivers are tolled using a congestion pricing system based on the real-time levels of traffic. All tolls are collected using an open road tolling system, and therefore there are no toll booths to receive cash. For the segment in Riverside County, carpools with three or more people have toll-free access, provided they have a FasTrak Flex transponder with its switch set to indicate the number of the vehicle's occupants (1, 2, or 3 or more). Solo drivers and carpools with two people may also use the FasTrak standard tag without the switch. Drivers without any FasTrak tag on the Riverside County HOT lanes will be assessed a toll violation regardless of whether they qualified for free. For the segment in San Diego County, each solo driver is required to carry a FasTrak transponder, while carpools, vanpools, transit riders, clean air vehicles, and motorcycles are not required to pay a toll. SANDAG does not offer the switchable FasTrak Flex tags directly, and instead instructs those drivers who do qualify for free to just remove their FasTrak standard tag off their windshield or cover it in the provided mylar bag to avoid being charged.

A separate project in San Bernardino County would extend the express lanes to Duncan Canyon Road in Fontana, and there are also long-range plans to extend the toll lanes at least as far south as SR 74 (Central Avenue) in Lake Elsinore.

History

I-15 replaced US 395 between San Diego and Temecula, US 66 between San Bernardino and Barstow, and US 91 north of Barstow.

I-15 was initially planned to run from I-10 near San Bernardino along the current I-215 alignment then up through the Cajon Pass and on to Las Vegas, with a distance of  within the state. California successfully argued in favor of the addition south to San Diego, suggesting that the freeway would connect the major military bases, the former March AFB (now March ARB) and the former NAS Miramar (now MCAS Miramar). US 395 was then signed TEMP-15 and the "old" I-15 between Devore and San Bernardino became part of modern-day I-215.

On January 24, 1957, the State Highway Commission defined the Escondido Freeway as what are now Routes 15 and 215 from Route 805 to Route 91. This entire segment was previously US 395 when it was named. Since then, the definition was extended on Route 15 south to Route 8 by Assembly Concurrent Resolution 34, Chapter 67 in 1979. Meanwhile, the segment of Route 15 from the San Diego County Line to the I-15/I-215 interchange was named the Temecula Valley Freeway in 1990.

The original definition for the Corona Freeway, as named by the State Highway Commission on July 23, 1958, stated that it was "Routes 71, 91, and 15 from Route 10 West of Pomona to Route 215".

This legal definition has been amended twice: First, in 1990, the California Assembly passed Concurrent Resolution 125, Chapter 78, renaming I-15 between the San Diego County Line (which is further south from I-215) and Bundy Canyon Road near Lake Elsinore as the Temecula Valley Freeway.

Then, in 1993, the California Assembly passed legislation officially designating SR 71 as a part of the Chino Valley Freeway. However, the "Corona Freeway" name is sometimes still applied to this portion of SR 71; thus, despite the official change, guide signs on I-10 eastbound and SR 57 southbound at the Kellogg Interchange in Pomona continued to refer to SR 71 as the "Corona Freeway" until the signs were replaced some time later.

Present SR 15 was signed after the creation of I-15 in 1968. Since I-15's southern terminus was at I-8, SR 15 was signed mostly along 40th Street and Wabash Boulevard in San Diego to its merge with I-5. The portion between Adams Avenue and I-805 remained a city street for a long time, and this portion was not completed until January 2000. For this reason, the freeway is sometimes referred to as the 40th Street Freeway.

Before the completion of the freeway, from 1968 to 1992, the neighborhood was known for prostitution, drugs, driveby shootings, and gangs. This was indirectly caused by Caltrans' plans to build a freeway in this area on land where houses were. Because families did not want to live in these houses since they would be soon torn down, they rented them to individuals who were only going to be in the area on a temporary basis, many of whom were involved in illegal activities. Even though the freeway was officially added to the Caltrans proposals as early as 1968, it was not until March 1992 that construction began. Many in the city opposed the building of this freeway, although some petitioned for the freeway to be built because of the poor conditions in the neighborhood.

Most of I-15 has undergone major improvements from Devore to the Nevada State Line, beginning in 2002 and costing $349 million. These improvements were designed to improve traffic flow on the heavily traveled highway for those going to and from Las Vegas. Most of the construction was completed by winter 2009. The new agricultural inspection station opened in August 2018.

State Route 31

The piece south of US 60 (Mission Boulevard), running along North Main Street, Hamner Avenue, and Milliken Avenue, was state-maintained by 1955, but was not assigned a signed number. This was still the only existing piece in 1963, and had a planned freeway replacement to the east.

In the 1964 renumbering, the route was assigned as SR 31. It was added to the Interstate Highway System in February 1972 as a realignment of I-15 (the former alignment became I-15E). However, as soon as the reroute was made, the cities of San Bernardino and Riverside voiced concerns that this new routing, which completely bypassed their city centers, would have a negative effect on their development plans. Together, these cities devised a plan in which the new western route via Corona and Ontario would become Interstate 15W, while US 395 would be renumbered Interstate 15E, regardless of the actual non-Interstate status of the latter route. Legislative changes were made in 1974, eliminating SR 31 (along with SR 71 south of Corona) in favor of I-15W. However, SR 31 continued to be signed—as temporary I-15W—until present I-15 was finished. (A 1986 map shows state maintenance continuing north past SR 60 to Jurupa Street, where it turned east to I-15.)

Future
The segment signed as California SR 15 from I-5 to I-8 in San Diego is planned be redesignated as part of I-15 once this segment is completely upgraded to Interstate standards, namely where the freeway's interchange with SR 94 is concerned. The interchange currently has left-exits and blind merges, and is due to be updated with a long-awaited widening of both SR 15 and SR 94. At that time, SR 15 is planned to be signed as part of I-15. The remaining portion of SR 15 conforms with Interstate standards.

In 2020, Brightline signed a 50-year lease for use of the I-15 right-of-way between the Victor Valley and Nevada border for use in their Brightline West high-speed rail service.

Exit list

Related routes
I-215 is the only auxiliary Interstate Highway associated with I-15 in California. Business routes of Interstate 15 exist in Escondido, Lake Elsinore, Norco, Victorville, Barstow, and Baker.

See also

Notes

References

External links

Official sites:
 – includes toll information on the San Diego County Express Lanes and the other San Diego Area toll facilities

Other:
Interstate 15 @ Interstate-Guide.com
California @ AARoads.com – Interstate 15
Caltrans: Interstate 15 highway conditions
California Highways: Interstate 15

15
 California
015
Mojave Desert
Interstate 15
Interstate 15
Interstate 15
Barstow, California
U.S. Route 66 in California